George Plumer (December 5, 1762 – June 8, 1843) was a member of the U.S. House of Representatives from Pennsylvania.

George Plumer was born near Pittsburgh, Pennsylvania.  He was a member of the Pennsylvania House of Representatives from 1812 to 1815 and again in 1817.

Plumer was elected as a Republican to the Seventeenth Congress, elected as a Jackson Republican to the Eighteenth Congress, and reelected as a Jacksonian to the Nineteenth Congress.  He declined to be a candidate for renomination and engaged in agricultural pursuits.  He died near West Newton, Pennsylvania, in 1843.  Interment in Old Sewickley Presbyterian Church Cemetery.

Sources

The Political Graveyard

Members of the Pennsylvania House of Representatives
Politicians from Pittsburgh
American Presbyterians
1762 births
1843 deaths
Democratic-Republican Party members of the United States House of Representatives from Pennsylvania
Jacksonian members of the United States House of Representatives from Pennsylvania
19th-century American politicians